Nell Irvin Painter (born Nell Elizabeth Irvin; August 2, 1942) is an American historian notable for her works on United States Southern history of the nineteenth century.  She is retired from Princeton University as the Edwards Professor of American History Emerita. She has served as president of the Organization of American Historians and as president of the Southern Historical Association, and was appointed as chair of MacDowell's board of directors in 2020.

Early life
She was born as Nell Irvin in Houston, Texas, to Dona Lolita (McGruder) Irvin and Frank Edward Irvin. Her mother held a degree from Houston College for Negroes (1937) and later taught in the public schools of Oakland, California. Her father had to drop out of college in 1937 during the Great Depression; he eventually trained for work as a laboratory technician. He worked for years at the University of California, Berkeley, where he trained many students in lab techniques. She had an older brother Frank, who died young.

Her family moved to Oakland, California, when she was ten weeks old. They were part of the second wave of the Great Migration of millions of African Americans from the Deep South to urban centers; from the 1940s to 1970, many migrated to the West Coast for jobs related to the growing defense industry, especially in California. Some of their relatives had been in California since the 1920s.

Education
Painter attended the Oakland Public Schools, including Oakland Technical High School, from which she graduated in 1959.

She earned her B.A. in anthropology from the University of California, Berkeley, in 1964.  During her undergraduate years, she studied French medieval history at the University of Bordeaux, France, 1962–63. As a postgraduate, she also studied abroad at the Institute of African Studies at the University of Ghana, 1965–66. In 1967, she completed an M.A. at the University of California, Los Angeles. In 1974, she earned an M.A. and Ph.D. at Harvard University.

After her retirement from Princeton, Painter returned to school at Mason Gross School of the Arts at Rutgers University, where she received a BFA in art in 2009. She next earned an MFA in painting from Rhode Island School of Design in 2011. Her first memoir, Old in Art School, reflects on this experience.

Career
After receiving her Ph.D., Painter worked as an assistant professor and then an associate professor at the University of Pennsylvania. From 1980 to 1988 she was a professor of history at the University of North Carolina at Chapel Hill. In 1988 she became a professor of history at Princeton University. In 1990–91 she was acting director of Princeton's Program in Afro-American Studies, and in 1991 she was named the Edwards Professor of American History. From 1997 to 2000 she was director of the Program in African-American Studies. She served as a professor at Princeton until her retirement in 2005.

Publications

Painter has written the following eight books as of 2018. In addition, she has written many reviews, essays, and articles. Her latest essay (from 2020, called My Corona Occupation) is about her experience with making art and writing during the pandemic. [read more on macdowellcolony.org

 
 

 
 
 
  A 'New York Times bestseller.
 Old in Art School: A Memoir of Starting Over. Counterpoint Press, 2018. .

In addition to her writing, she creates art revolving around the discrimination against African Americans and displays this work at her annual art events. http://www.nellpainter.com/art.html

Recognition
Painter has received honorary degrees from Dartmouth College, Wesleyan University, and Yale University, among other institutions. In 1986 she received a Candace Award from the National Coalition of 100 Black Women.

Personal life
In 1989, Painter married the statistician Glenn Shafer, co-creator of the Dempster–Shafer theory.

References

External links

Official website
Guide to the Nell Irvin Painter Papers, David M. Rubenstein Rare Book & Manuscript Library, Duke University
"Nell Irvin Painter", Department of History, Princeton University

In Depth interview with Painter, January 6, 2008
Interview with Painter on "New Books in African American Studies", January 14, 2011
"There is no such thing as the 'white race' — or any other race, says historian", The Sunday Edition, CBC Radio, September 17, 2017
Jeffrey Brown, [https://www.pbs.org/newshour/show/this-new-and-old-artist-offers-a-self-portrait-in-starting-over "This new and 'old' artist offers a self-portrait in starting over", PBS NewsHour, July 23, 2018

1942 births
Living people
20th-century American historians
21st-century American historians
African-American historians
American women historians
21st-century American artists
Harvard University alumni
Historians of the Southern United States
Princeton University faculty
University of California, Berkeley alumni
University of California, Los Angeles alumni
Wesleyan University people
Writers from Oakland, California
21st-century American women writers
20th-century American women writers
American women academics
American academic administrators
African-American educators
White culture scholars
Rhode Island School of Design alumni
Historians from California
20th-century African-American women writers
20th-century African-American writers
21st-century African-American women
21st-century African-American artists